Everything Is Changing is the debut studio album by the former The Gathering and Agua de Annique vocalist Anneke van Giersbergen.

Track list

Credits
 Anneke van Giersbergen - vocals, guitar, keyboards, piano, acoustic guitar
 Daniel Cardoso - vocals, piano, guitars, bass
 Rob Snijders - drums
 Dennis Leeflang - drums (tracks 5, 9, 11)
 Ruud Jolie - guitars (tracks 1, 2, 4, 7, 12)
 Ferry Duijsens - guitars (track 9)
 Joost van Haaren - bass (track 2)
 René Markelbach - keyboards (track 9), grand piano (track 6)
 Camilla van der Kooij - violins (track 6)

References 

2012 albums
Anneke van Giersbergen (band) albums